The Annie Award for Outstanding Achievement for Music in a Feature Production (or Annie Award for Outstanding Achievement for Music in an Animated Feature Production) is an Annie Award given annually to the best music in an animated feature film, theatrical or direct-to-video. It began in 1997 as the Annie Award for "Best Individual Achievement: Music in a Feature/Home Video Production". Throughout the following years, the title was renamed "Outstanding Individual Achievement for Music in an Animated Feature Production", "Outstanding Individual Achievement for Music Score in an Animated Feature Production", and "Outstanding Music in an Animated Feature Production" before changing to its current title in 2005. It was retitled "Best Music in an Animated Feature Production" in 2006 for three years before being reverted to "Music in an Animated Feature Production" in 2009.

Winners and nominees
†=Non-feature nominee
₳=Non-theatrical feature nominee

1990s

2000s

2010s

2020s

Award Records

Multiple Wins 
5 wins

 Michael Giacchino

4 wins

 Randy Newman
 John Powell

2 wins

 Kristen Anderson-Lopez
 Germaine Franco
 Robert Lopez
 Hans Zimmer

Multiple Nominations 

12 nominations

 John Powell

8 nominations

 Randy Newman

6 nominations

 Michael Giacchino
 Harry Gregson-Williams

5 nominations

 Henry Jackman

4 nominations

 Jeff Danna
 Danny Elfman
 Kristen Anderson-Lopez
 Robert Lopez
 Hans Zimmer

3 nominations

 Christophe Beck
 Bruno Coulais
 Mychael Danna
 Alexandre Desplat
 Joe Hisaishi
 James Newton Howard
 Alan Menken
 Mark Mothersbaugh
 Heitor Pereira
 Richard Stone

2 nominations

 Steven Bernstein
 Phil Collins
 John Debney
 Germaine Franco
 Carl Johnson
 Kíla
 Mark Mancina
 Joel McNeely
 Lin-Manuel Miranda
 David Newman
 Stephen Schwartz
 Theodore Shapiro
 Alan Silvestri

See also
 Hollywood Music in Media Award for Best Original Score in an Animated Film

References

External links 
 Annie Awards: Legacy

Annie Awards
Film awards for best score